The Hawker Duiker was an unusual and unsuccessful aircraft. It was the first design at Hawker under a new chief designer, Captain Thomson, in 1922. Much of the equipment and parts were proprietary and made by another aircraft company, Vickers, which shared the airfield at Brooklands with Hawker. The Duiker was a parasol wing monoplane in a period where the biplane held sway.

Design and development
The Duiker was designed to meet a requirement for a Corps Reconnaissance aircraft to carry out operations in support of the Army, which eventually was drawn up into Air Ministry Specification 7/22.

The Duiker had an all-wood structure. The wing was slightly swept back, which gave rise to instability at all speeds, and even caused the separation of the wing from the rear struts. The fin was rather small and was typical of Sopwith design in shape. An Armstrong Siddeley Jaguar engine was initially used, but this was later changed to a Bristol Jupiter IV. The first flight took place in July 1923. Only one aircraft was built.

Specifications

See also

References

 Mason, Francis K, Hawker Aircraft since 1920. London:Putnam, Third edition 1991. .

1920s British military reconnaissance aircraft
Single-engined tractor aircraft
Parasol-wing aircraft
Duiker
Aircraft first flown in 1923